Secondary Highway 520, commonly referred to as Highway 520, is a provincially maintained highway in the Canadian province of Ontario.

The highway links several remote First Nation hamlets to the major highway routes of the region. However, the only places of noteworthy size are the village of Magnetawan and the town of Burk's Falls.

Route description 
It continues east, then south through a sparsely populated region of the Canadian Shield, though providing access to several First Nation villages. Highway520 then branches to the south, meets Highway 510 and passes through the village of Magnetawan.

Southeast of Magnetawan, the highway winds along the northern shore of Cecebe Lake, bisecting several small communities en route. It enters the town of Burk's Falls, where it is known as Ryerson Centre Road. Passing beneath the Burk's Falls Bypass of Highway11, Highway520 parallels the Magnetawan River briefly then turns south onto Ontario Street, the former alignment of Highway11. It crosses the river and travels through the centre of the town, meeting the bypass south of it. Highway520 ends at an interchange with Highway11, at Exit257, south of Burk's Falls.
The portion of Highway520 from the intersection of Ontario Street south to the Burk's Falls town limits is maintained under a Connecting Link agreement.

History 
Highway 520 is one of many Secondary Highways assigned a route number in 1956.
Prior to this time, the route was a numbered, but unposted Development Road maintained by the Department of Highways.

Major intersections

References 

520
Roads in Parry Sound District